The cabinet was selected by Prime Minister Ali Zeidan on 30 October 2012 and was approved by the General National Congress on 31 October 2012 together with approving Zidan as Libya's first post-war Prime Minister. The cabinet is composed of the following ministers: Two women were selected to cabinet, and select ministries (Defence, Foreign Affairs, Finance, Interior and Justice) went to political independents who were not associated with any party.

The Zeidan government was officially inaugurated on 14 November 2012.

The Ministers in charge of electricity [Ali Mohammed Mihirig], higher education [Abdulasalm Bashir Duabi] and relations with congress [Muaz Fathi Al-Kujah] have also been rejected by the integrity commission. The nominee for the minister of higher education (Abdulasalm Bashir Duabi) was ruled unfit to hold public office. Ashour Shuail was cleared by an appeals court and took office on 11 December 2012. Ali Mohammed Mihirig was also cleared by an appeals court.

Four other nominees fates were not decided on by the integrity commission as of 14 November 2012. They were Ali Al-Aujali (Foreign Affairs), Kamla Khamis Al-Mazini (Social Affairs), Ahmed Ayad Ali Al-Urfi (Agriculture) and Abdulsalam Mohammed Abusaad (Religious Affairs and Awqaf). Sami Al-Saadi, who was nominated for the Minister of the Martyrs, resigned on 7 November 2012 

Nominees for Foreign Affairs Minister Ali Al-Aujali, Social Affairs Minister Kamla Khamis Al-Mazini and Agriculture Minister Ahmed Ayad Ali Al-Urfi were cleared by the integrity commission.
Nominee for Religious Affairs Minister Abdusalam Mohammed Abusaad was still being investigated. Ali Al-Aujali resigned from the cabinet on 31 December 2012.

References

Cabinets established in 2012
Government of Libya
Libyan Crisis (2011–present)
Political history of Libya